Hantai is a town under the administration of Xinle City in southwestern Hebei province, China, located  east-southeast of downtown Xinle. , it has 19 villages under its administration.

See also
List of township-level divisions of Hebei

References

Township-level divisions of Hebei